Alarab may refer to:
Al-Arab, a pan-Arab newspaper based in London
Alarab News Channel, an Arabic-language news channel
Kul al-Arab (website alarab.com), Israeli Arabic-language weekly newspaper